Tomiño Fútbol Club, is a Spanish football club based in the municipality of Tomiño. They currently play in Segunda Autonómica, the sixth tier of Spanish football.

Season to season

0 seasons in Tercera División

References
official website
senafutbolmarin.blogspot.com.es profile
Futbolme.com profile

Football clubs in Galicia (Spain)
Divisiones Regionales de Fútbol clubs
Association football clubs established in 1934
1934 establishments in Spain